José María Aierdi Fernández de Barrena (born 1958) is a Basque politician, Second Vice President of Navarre and Minister of Territorial Planning, Housing, Landscape and Strategic Projects of Navarre. He was previously a member of the Parliament of Navarre and mayor of Lekunberri.

Early life
Aierdi was born in 1958 in Etxauri, Navarre. He has a diploma in basic general education.

Career
Aierdi was one of the founders of the Cooperativa Napar Bideak and the Asociación de Alimentos Artesanos de Navarra. He was in charge of the Sociedad Agraria de Transformación Bikain until 2015. He was a founder and president of the Consorcio Turístico del Plazaola from 1994 to 2006. He was president of the Cederna-Garalur local development association from 1991 to 1999 and from 2011 to 2015. Since 2015, he has been managing director of Nasuvinsa (Navarra de Suelo y Vivienda S.A.) and a manager of CAT (Ciudad Agroalimentaria de Tudela S.A.).

Aierdi was mayor of Lekunberri from 1984 to 2015. He contested the 1999 regional election in Navarre as a Basque Solidarity–Basque Nationalist Party electoral alliance candidate and was elected to the Parliament of Navarre. He was second secretary during the 5th Parliament.

In August 2019, Aierdi was appointed Second Vice President of Navarre and Minister of Territorial Planning, Housing, Landscape and Strategic Projects by President María Chivite.

Electoral history

References

1958 births
Basque Nationalist Party politicians
Geroa Bai politicians
Government ministers of Navarre
Living people
Mayors of places in Navarre
Members of the 5th Parliament of Navarre
Politicians from Navarre
People from Norte de Aralar
Vice Presidents of Navarre